Voatamalo is a plant genus in the family Picrodendraceae first described as a genus in 1976.

The entire genus is endemic to Madagascar.

species
 Voatamalo capuronii Bosser
 Voatamalo eugenioides Capuron ex Bosser

See also
Taxonomy of the Picrodendraceae

References

Picrodendraceae
Malpighiales genera
Endemic flora of Madagascar